Laurent Cleenewerck (legally Cleenewerck de Kiev) is an academic and theologian, serving as professor of international administration and theology for EUCLID (Euclid University), and on the faculty of the Ukrainian Catholic University (and previously at Humboldt State University). He is the rector of Eureka Orthodox Church. He and his family currently reside in Northern California.

Upbringing and education
Cleenewerck was born in 1969 in Montpellier (France) of a notable Flemish family, and spent part of his childhood in Connecticut. After earning a Baccalaureat C (Sciences) in 1986, he graduated from two national programs and from the University of Montpelier, France (Institute nonadministrative dies Enterprises) in 1989 with degrees in Computer Science, International Affairs, Finance and Business Administration. He holds a Licentiate in Sacred Theology from the St. Sergius Orthodox Theological Institute (Paris, France) and a Master's in Ecumenical Studies from the Ukrainian Catholic University, being the first graduate in that program's English-language stream. He also pursued further studies at St. Tikhon's Orthodox Theological Seminary (Pennsylvania) in 2002-2004 and obtained a Doctorate of Science in the Study of Religion from the Universidad Rural de Guatemala (St Gregory Nazianzen Orthodox Institute; now St. Gregory Nazianzen Institute for Eastern Christian Studies). He also received a Ph.D. in public health from the Central University of Nicaragua in 2022.

Professional life
Cleenewerck currently teaches theology, international administration and global health for EUCLID (Euclid University), as well as Ecumenical Methods for the Ukrainian Catholic University. He also occasionally serves as extension faculty (Economics, Sciences) for the Humboldt State University. He is the rector of St. Innocent's Orthodox parish in Eureka and engaged in public lecturing, ministry, as well as further writing and research.
Prior to 2004, he held managerial and technological positions in Paris and California while being active with various associations, notably in the field of refugee assistance and bioethics (Republic of Lomar Foundation, Human Bioethics Treaty Organization).
Although retired from non-academic public activities, he is a member of several professional and academic associations, including the Orthodox Theological Society of America and Euclid's Organization for the Study of Treaty Law (OSTL).

Scientific, diplomatic and educational work
After holding technical positions at IBM and Neurones in the early 1990s, he relocated to Silicon Valley, California and pursued work in applying Internet technologies to social programs. He was one of the co-founders of the Republic of Lomar Foundation, a visionary effort to renew the concept of the Nansen passport which lasted until 2002. In 2003–2004, he also served as Secretary-General of the Human Bioethics Treaty Organization, a non-governmental organization dedicated to inter-religious and non-religious bioethical reflection. Together with Faustin-Archange Touadéra (current president of the Central African Republic), he was a key architect in the formation of EUCLID as an intergovernmental university based in Bangui.
His epistemological approach heavily relies on the primacy of the scientific method of inquiry, critical thinking and dialectical confrontations. Following John Polkinghorne and William Lane Craig, Cleenewerck is convinced that the convergence between science and theology provides for new avenues of dialogue, reflection and apologetics. He considers diplomacy an essential human activity with great applicability to all aspects of human life, especially religious dialogue.
He has co-authored several articles dealing with bioethics published in the Journal of Religion and Health.

Ecclesiastical life
He is a presbyter of the Eastern Orthodox Church, ordained in the Ukrainian Orthodox Church of the USA, received in the Orthodox Church in America in 2007. He is the rector of St Innocent Orthodox Church in Eureka, CA and holds the rank of archpriest in the Orthodox Church in America.

Theological work
Cleenewerck's main ideas are presented in his comprehensive study of the historical and theological causes of the current separation between Roman Catholicism and Eastern Orthodoxy (His Broken Body – Understanding and Healing the Schism between the Roman Catholic and Eastern Orthodox Churches). Like John Zizioulas, he is an advocate of Eucharistic ecclesiology which he articulates as Holographic anesthesiology. The outline and implication of this model were published in the Journal of Ecumenical Studies in 2010. He is a proponent of non-partisan ecumenical dialogue with the ideal of a return to the basics of pre-Nicene orthodoxy.

Pr. Cleenewerck serves as editor of the EOB (Eastern / Greek Orthodox Bible) of which the New Testament volume was published in 2010. His Catechism of the Orthodox Faith remains an active project.

He is also engaged in public debates and interested in constructive dialogue between Christianity and Islam.

Interfaith Award 
Cleenewerck authored an academic paper on Christian - Muslim dialogue as part of the 2016 UN World Interfaith Harmony Week organized by EUCLID, which won the first prize award as an organization. In April 2016, he was invited to receive an award from King Abdullah II of Jordan and to deliver a speech at the award ceremony of the World Interfaith Harmony Week held in Amman, Jordan.

Bibliography
- A Handbook of Basic Bioethics: an HBTO Guide (Editor), 2004
- "Japan on the Edge: An inquiry into the Japanese Government’s Struggle for Superpower Status and UN Security Council Membership at the Edge of Decline" (co-authored with Roberto M Rodriguez), (EUC Press), 2009 -  
- "His Broken Body: Understanding and healing the schism between the Roman Catholic and Eastern Orthodox Churches" (EUC Press), 2008 -  
- EOB: The Eastern Orthodox Bible - New Testament (Editor), 2007-2015 
- "Maximal care considerations when treating end-stage heart failure patients: Ethical and procedural quandaries in management of the very sick" (with Ernst Schwarz et al.), Journal of Religion and Health, 2010 
- "The recovery of Eucharistic and Holographic Ecclesiology as a promising avenue of ecumenical dialogue and broader mutual recognition" (with Ernst Schwarz et al.), Journal of Ecumenical Studies, 2010 
- "Binding and Non-Binding Instruments in Intergovernmental Relations: A diplomat’s guide to understand the concepts of treaty and memorandum of understanding in theory and practice" (General Editor, Euclid University Press, 2015)
- "The Effect of Spirituality and Religion on Outcomes in Patients with Chronic Heart Failure" (with Jesse J. Naghi, Kiran J. Philip, and Ernst Schwarz), Journal of Religion and Health, 2010 
- "Philosophical implications of the systemic and patient-oriented management of chronic heart failure" (with Ernst Schwarz, Anita Phan, Russell Hobbs), Journal of Religion and Health, 2010 
- "Aiparthenos | Ever-Virgin? Understanding the Orthodox Catholic Doctrine of the Perpetual Virginity of Mary, the Mother of Jesus, and the Identity of James and the Brothers and Sisters of the Lord", (EUC Press), 2015
- Malaria Prevention Measures among Pregnant Women: A Population-Based Survey in Nnewi, Nigeria. Scientific World Journal (2019), with co-authors

References

1969 births
21st-century theologians
University of Montpellier alumni
French emigrants to the United States
Humboldt State University faculty
American Christian theologians
French Christian theologians
Living people
Eastern Orthodox theologians